Lebedin is a rural locality (a khutor) in Lobazovsky Selsoviet Rural Settlement, Oktyabrsky District, Kursk Oblast, Russia. Population:

Geography 
The khutor is located 67 km from the Russia–Ukraine border, 22 km south-west of Kursk, 11 km south of the district center – the urban-type settlement Pryamitsyno, 2.5 km from the selsoviet center – Zhuravlino.

 Climate
Lebedin has a warm-summer humid continental climate (Dfb in the Köppen climate classification).

Transport 
Lebedin is located 6 km from the federal route  Crimea Highway (a part of the European route ), 3 km from the road of regional importance  ("Crimea Highway" – Ivanino, part of the European route ), on the road of intermunicipal significance  (38K-010 – Lebedin), 12 km from the nearest railway station Dyakonovo (railway line Lgov I — Kursk).

The rural locality is situated 32 km from Kursk Vostochny Airport, 107 km from Belgorod International Airport and 228 km from Voronezh Peter the Great Airport.

References

Notes

Sources

Rural localities in Oktyabrsky District, Kursk Oblast